Gerry Hurley (born 16 May 1984) is an Irish rugby union player. He plays as a scrum-half. Hurley won a Munster Schools Rugby Senior Cup title with Rockwell College. He plays his club rugby with Cork Constitution.

Garryowen
Hurley won the All-Ireland League and Cup with Garryowen.

Cork Constitution
Hurley captained his club side Cork Constitution to the All-Ireland Cup on 27 April 2013.

Munster
Whilst still in the Munster academy, Hurley made his first senior start for Munster in a pre-season friendly against the USA on 26 August 2007. Hurley made his Celtic League debut as a substitute in Munster's 26–26 win against Scarlets on 22 September 2007. His Heineken Cup debut came against Clermont Auvergne on 18 November 2007, with Hurley coming on as a substitute in the 36–13 win in Thomond Park. Hurley graduated from the Munster Academy at the end of the 2007–08 season, but did not receive a contract.

Hurley started for Munster in an uncapped friendly against La Rochelle on 12 August 2011.
Despite not earning a contract when he graduated from the Munster Academy in 2008, Hurley signed a one-year training contract with Munster in July 2013. He came off the bench during Munster's Pro12 game against Connacht on 27 December 2013, his first appearance for Munster in 6 years. He was added to Munster's 2013-14 Heineken Cup squad on 20 March 2014.

Ireland
Hurley captained the Ireland Club XV side against England Counties XV to a 30–20 victory on 8 February 2013. He also captained the side during their 30–18 defeat to Scotland Clubs on 8 March 2013.

References

External links
Munster Profile

1984 births
Living people
Rugby union players from County Cork
Irish rugby union players
Garryowen Football Club players
Cork Constitution players
Munster Rugby players
Rugby union scrum-halves